The 2021 FINA Diving World Cup was scheduled to take place in Tokyo, Japan, from 21 to 26 April 2020. It was to be the 22nd edition of the biennial diving competition, and the first time this specific FINA event was to be held in Tokyo and Japan. The venue was to be the Tokyo Aquatics Centre, and the final qualifying diving event for the 2020 Summer Olympics.

The event was postponed in response to the COVID-19 pandemic, after consulting with the International Olympic Committee. This followed the cancellation of the Beijing stop for the FINA Diving World Series in February 2020, and suspension of all other FINA events in March.

The competition was scheduled to take place on 18–23 April 2021. However on 2 April 2021, it was reported by BBC Sport that the event was "under review" and likely to be cancelled, citing COVID-19-related concerns and logistical costs, a state of emergency declared over novel SARS-CoV-2 variants, and that the Japanese government "did not take all the necessary measures" to ensure a fair and successful competition. On 9 April 2021 it was announced that the 2021 Fina Diving World Cup would take place on 1–6 May.

Schedule 

All times are local Japan Standard Time (UTC+9) and based on approximate entry numbers. They will be subject to revision.

Medal summary

Men's events

Women's events

Medal table

Participating countries 

A total of 47 countries have confirmed to participate in the event

 (2)
 (3)
 (1)
 (3)
 (8)
 (10)
 (3)
 (2)
 (7)
 (1)
 (2)
 (1)
 (2)
 (4)
 (4)
 (3)
 (11)
 (14)
 (3)
 (1)
 (1)
 (2)
 (5)
 (10)
 (1)
 (13)
 (1)
 (3)
 (10)
 (12)
 (2)
 (2)
 (2)
 (3)
 (4)
 (2)
 (10)
 (7)
 (2)
 (8)
 (7)
 (5)
 (3)
 (11)
 (9)
 (5)

Invitational Teams 

 Osaka Tōin Junior and Senior High School (6)
 United States U-20 (5)
 University of Oxford (7)
 Tokyo International University (5)
 Japan U-18 (5)
 Real Madrid (5)
 Michigan Wolverines (5)
 Universidad Nacional de Colombia (4)

References

External links 

FINA Diving World Cup
FINA Diving World Cup
FINA Diving World Cup
Sports competitions in Tokyo
Diving competitions in Japan
International aquatics competitions hosted by Japan
FINA
FINA